The Ministry of Local Government, Rural Development and Co-operatives (Sthānīẏa sarakāra, pallī unnaẏana ō samabāẏa mantraṇālaẏa) is a ministry of the government of the People's Republic of Bangladesh. It is responsible for the housing and building, regional and rural policy, municipal and cities administration and finances, and the conduct of elections.

The Ministry of Local Government, Rural Development and Co-operatives contains two divisions:
Local Government Division
Rural Development and Co-operatives Division

Organization

Local Government Division
Local Government Body 
Barishal City Corporation
Chattogram City Corporation
Comilla City Corporation
Dhaka North City Corporation
Dhaka South City Corporation
Narayanganj City Corporation
Khulna City Corporation
Sylhet City Corporation
Rajshahi City Corporation
Rangpur City Corporation
Mymensingh City Corporation
Gazipur City Corporation
 Others Department 
Water Supply and Sewerage Authority 
Chattogram WASA
Dhaka WASA
Khulna WASA
Rajshahi WASA
Public Health Engineering Department
National Institute of Local Government
Local Government Engineering Department

Rural Development and Co-operatives Division
Department of Cooperatives
Bangladesh Rural Development Board (BRDB)
Rural Poverty Alleviation Foundation (PDBF)
Small Farmer Development Foundation (SFDF)
Bangladesh Cooperative Bank
Bangladesh dairy farmer co-operative Union Limited (Milk Vita)
Bangladesh Academy for Rural Development (BARD)
Rural Development Academy (RDA) Bogra
Bangabandhu Poverty Alleviation and Rural Development (BAPARD)

References

 
Local Government, Rural Development and Co-operatives
Rural development in Bangladesh
Local government in Bangladesh
Cooperatives ministries
Local government ministries
Rural development ministries